Ratlou Local Municipality (formerly Setla-Kgobi Local Municipality) is a local municipality in Ngaka Modiri Molema District Municipality, North West Province, South Africa.

Main places
The 2001 census divided the municipality into the following main places:

Politics 

The municipal council consists of twenty-seven members elected by mixed-member proportional representation. Fourteen councillors are elected by first-past-the-post voting in fourteen wards, while the remaining thirteen are chosen from party lists so that the total number of party representatives is proportional to the number of votes received. In the election of 1 November 2021 the African National Congress (ANC) won a majority of nineteen seats on the council.
The following table shows the results of the election.

References

External links
 https://web.archive.org/web/20130521205531/http://ratlou.gov.za/

Local municipalities of the Ngaka Modiri Molema District Municipality